The AN/ARC-164 is an US military UHF aircraft radio that operates in the aeronautical mobile (OR) service / B band (NATO). It was first introduced in 1981 and might be found on B-52G/H, B-1B, C/EC/RC-26D, C-5, KC-135, C-23, C-130, C-141, F-15, A-10, F-16, UH-1D, CH-47, H-53, H-60 and S-3B aircraft.

System Description
The ARC-164 is a military UHF AM aircraft station that operates between 225-399.975 MHz (the NATO harmonised UHF band 225-400 MHz is also a subset of this particular band as defined by the NJFA) and transmits at 10 watts. It features a separate guard receiver for monitoring 243 MHz while simultaneously monitoring the active channel selected, an ECCM slice capable of storing multiple Word-of-Day patterns for Havequick operation, and can also serve as a channel selector and audio demodulator for separate UHF DF systems.  There are 2 common installations: remote and panel.  With a remote installation, the R/T is in a remote location, while the panel installation features an all-in-one R/T and control panel.

See also
List of military electronics of the United States
Aircraft station, Radiocommunication service
 AN/ARC-232 replacement

References

External links
Description from manufacturer's site
AN/ARC-232, a form-fit-function replacement for the 164, with wider frequency range and more modern ECCM

Equipment of the United States Air Force
Military radio systems of the United States
Military electronics of the United States
Goods manufactured in the United States
Military equipment introduced in the 1980s